The bare-naped goby (Tridentiger nudicervicus) is a species of goby native to marine and brackish waters along the coasts of eastern Asia.  This species can reach a length of  TL.

References

bare-naped goby
Fish of Japan
Fish of China
Fish of Taiwan
bare-naped goby